Alerothrips is a genus of thrips in the family Phlaeothripidae. The genus has an Asian distribution, with one species known from India and two from Thailand.

Species
 Alerothrips banpoti
 Alerothrips indicus
 Alerothrips thailandicus

References

Phlaeothripidae
Thrips genera